Joanne Davies (born 10 September 1972) is a former English badminton player, capped 44 times for England and reached No. 8 in the World.

Biography
She has won team gold and individual silver medals in the 1998 Commonwealth Games. She represented Great Britain at the 2000 Summer Olympics in Sydney, Australia. Davies was 11 weeks pregnant while she competing in Sydney. Davies married former Dutch national badminton player Jurgen van Leeuwen, and her son Ethan also played badminton.

She was the English National runner-up with her doubles partner Nichola Beck during the 1995 English National Championships.

Achievements

Commonwealth Games 
Mixed doubles

European Junior Championships 
Mixed doubles

IBF World Grand Prix
The World Badminton Grand Prix sanctioned by International Badminton Federation (IBF) since 1983.

Women's doubles

IBF International
Women's doubles

Mixed doubles

References

External links
 
 
 

1972 births
Living people
English female badminton players
Olympic badminton players of Great Britain
Badminton players at the 2000 Summer Olympics
Badminton players at the 1998 Commonwealth Games
Commonwealth Games gold medallists for England
Commonwealth Games silver medallists for England
Commonwealth Games medallists in badminton
Medallists at the 1998 Commonwealth Games